The 2014 election of the President of the Bohemian-Moravian Confederation of Trade Unions (ČMKOS) was held on 25 April 2014. It was held following resignation of the incumbent President Jaroslav Zavadil. Josef Středula was elected Confederation's new president after he defeated Václav Pícl.

Background
The incumbent President Jaroslav Zavadil resigned on his position on 19 November 2013 after he became Member of the Chamber of Deputies in 2013 election. Václav Pícl became acting President. President of KOVO Trade Union Josef Středula announced his candidacy on the same Day. Pícl expressed his interest in running KOVO gave its nomination to Středula.

Středula and Pícl became only Candidates in the election. Pícl stated he supports Diplomatic solutions of problems and conflicts while Středula supported more radical stances stating that he would support all protests to reach goals of the Confederation.

Results
Election was held on 25 April 2020. 227 Delegates were allowed to vote. Středula received 142 votes against Pícl's 67 and became the new president. 10 votes were invalid while8 delegates voted against both Candidates.

References

Histadrut
Bohemian-Moravian Confederation of Trade Unions
Trade union elections
Non-partisan elections